Harry Wootliff is an English film and television director and screenwriter.

Early life 
Wootliff trained at Elmhurst ballet school and Bristol Old Vic Theatre School.

Career 
Wootliff's debut short film Nits screened in Cannes Directors' Fortnight, was Bafta nominated, and won The BFI London Film Festival TCM Classic Shorts Film Competition, Soho Rushes, and Birds Eye View. Her second short film Trip starred Sam Hazeldine and premiered in Official Selection at Berlin.

Wootliff directed Coming Up episode "I Don't Care" for Channel 4, starring Paloma Faith, Iwan Rheon, David Leon and Mark Benton, the drama screened at Edinburgh Film Festival and Soho Rushes

In 2013 Wootliff was a finalist for the Arts Foundation Award for Screenwriting.

Wootliff's debut feature film, the critically acclaimed romantic drama Only You starring Laia Costa and Josh O'Connor, premiered 19 October 2018 at The London Film Festival, where it was nominated for both the First Feature Award and IWC Schaffhausen Filmmaker Bursary Award. Only You went on to win The Critics’ Award at the 30th Dinard Film Festival, two British Independent Film Awards, a Writers' Guild Award, and a BAFTA nomination.

Wootliff's second feature film True Things starring Ruth Wilson and Tom Burke, had its World Premiere at Venice, and also screened at Toronto and The London Film Festival, where it won the IWC Shaffhausen award. Samuel Goldwyn Films acquired North American distribution rights to the film.

Wootliff directed the finale of BBC/HBO's His Dark Materials season three. She is currently directing The Woman in the Wall, a Motive Pictures production, for BBC/Showtime.

References

External links 
 
 
 New talent: the rising stars of culture, science and food 2019

Year of birth missing (living people)
Living people
English screenwriters
British women screenwriters
People from Harrogate
English television directors
English women film directors
British women television directors